Livarden is a mountain in the city of Bergen in Vestland county, Norway. It is located southeast of the Ulriken mountain massif, on the border of the boroughs of Fana and Arna, just south of the village of Espeland.

See also
List of mountains of Norway

References

Mountains of Bergen
Mountains of Vestland